Lore Segal (born March 9, 1928), née Lore Groszmann, is an American novelist, translator, teacher, short story writer, and author of children's books. Her novel Shakespeare's Kitchen was a finalist for the Pulitzer Prize in 2008.

Early life
An only child, Segal was born in Vienna, Austria, into a middle-class Jewish family. Her father was a chief bank accountant and her mother was a housewife.

When Hitler annexed Austria in 1938, Segal's father found himself jobless and threatened. He listed the family on the American immigration quota, and in December that year Lore Segal joined other Jewish children on the first wave of the Kindertransport rescue mission, seeking safety in England." 

While with her English foster parents, she found a purple notebook and started writing, filling its 36 pages with German prose. It was the beginning of a novel she would eventually write in English, Other People's Houses.

On her eleventh birthday, her parents arrived in England on a domestic servants visa. Despite his refugee status, Lore Segal's father was labeled a German-speaking alien and interned on the Isle of Man, where he suffered a series of strokes. He died a few days before the war ended. Lore Segal then moved to London with her mother, where she would attend the Bedford College for Women at the University of London on a scholarship. She graduated in 1948 with an honors degree in English literature.

In 1951, after spending three years in the Dominican Republic with her mother, waiting for their US entry permit to arrive, they moved to Washington Heights, New York City, where they shared a two-room apartment with Lore Segal, her grandmother and uncle.

Career
Between 1968 and 1996, Segal taught writing at Columbia University's School of the Arts, Princeton, Bennington College, Sarah Lawrence, the University of Illinois at Chicago, and Ohio State University, from which she retired in 1996. She currently teaches at 92 Y.

Segal published her first novel, Other People's Houses, in 1964 to widespread acclaim. Collecting her refugee stories from The New Yorker and writing a few more, Segal fictionalized her experience growing up in five different English households, from the wealthy Orthodox Jewish Levines to the working-class Hoopers.

In 1985, Segal's third novel Her First American was published,  which The New York Times praised, saying, "Lore Segal may have come closer than anyone to writing The Great American Novel." It tells the story of Ilka Weissnix, a Jewish refugee from Nazi Europe, and her relationship with Carter Bayoux, a middle-aged black intellectual, "her first American". Segal based the character of Carter Bayoux on her friend Horace R. Cayton, Jr. She received an American Academy of Arts and Letters Award for the novel.

Shakespeare's Kitchen, published in 2007, was a finalist for the Pulitzer Prize. Thirteen stories make up the novel, each following members of the Concordance Institute, a Connecticut think tank.

Her latest novel Half the Kingdom was published by Melville House in October 2013.

Regarding her work, Segal has said, "I want to write about the stuff – in the midst of all the stew of being a human being – that is permanent, where Adam and Eve and I would have had the same experiences. I really am less interested in the social change." Her novels often deal with the process of assimilation, from a refugee arriving in a new country which must become her home (as in Her First American), to a flighty poet finding her footing in a constantly moving literary world (as in Lucinella).

Personal life
In 1961, Segal married David Segal, an editor at Knopf, who died nine years later. Together they had two children, Beatrice and Jacob.

Segal and her mother, Franzi Groszmann, appeared in the film Into the Arms of Strangers: Stories of the Kindertransport, directed by Mark Jonathan Harris, which won the Academy Award for Documentary Feature in 2000. Segal's mother was the last survivor of the parents who placed their children in the Kindertransport program. Franzi died in 2005, one hundred years old.

Segal lives on the Upper West Side of Manhattan.

Work

Novels
 Other People's Houses (1964)
 Lucinella (1976)
 Her First American (1985)
 Shakespeare's Kitchen (2007)
 Half The Kingdom (2013)

Short stories
"Burglars in the Flesh" (1980)
"A Wedding" (1981)
"The First American" (1983)
"An Absence of Cousins" (1987)
"The Reverse Bug" (1989)
"At Whom the Dog Barks" (1990)
"William's Shoes" (1991)
"Fatal Wish" (1991)
"Other People's Deaths" (2006)
"The Arbus Factor" (2007)
"Making Good" (2008)
"Spry for Frying" (2011)
"Ladies' Lunch" (2017)

Translations
 Gallows Songs of Christian Morgenstern (1967)
 The Juniper Tree and Other Tales from Grimm (1973) (Illustrated by Maurice Sendak)
 The Book of Adam to Moses (1987)
 The Story of King Saul and King David (1991)

Children's books
 Tell Me a Mitzi (1970)
 All the Way Home (1973)
 Tell Me a Trudy (1979)
 The Story of Old Mrs. Brubeck and How She Looked for Trouble and Where She Found Him (1981)
 The Story of Mrs. Lovewright and Purrless Her Cat (1985) (Illustrated by Paul O. Zelinsky)
 Morris the Artist (2003)
 Why Mole Shouted and Other Stories (2004)
 More Mole Stories and Little Gopher, Too (2005)

Awards
Dorothy & Lewis B. Cullman Center for Scholars Fellowship, 2008
Pulitzer Prize Finalist (Shakespeare's Kitchen, 2008)
PEN/ O. Henry Prize Story, ("Making Good," 2008)
Member, American Academy of Arts and Sciences, 2006
Best American Short Stories, ("The Reverse Bug,"1989 )
The O. Henry Awards Prize Story, ("The Reverse Bug,"1990)
University of Illinois, Senior University Scholar, 1987–1990
National Endowment for the Arts, Grant in Fiction, 1987–1988
American Academy and Institute of Arts and Letters Award, 1986
Harold U. Ribalow Prize, 1986
Carl Sandburg Award for Fiction, 1985
Artists Grant, The Illinois Arts Council, 1985
Grawemeyer Award for Faculty, University of Louisville,1983
National Endowment for the Humanities, Grant in Translation, 1982
National Endowment for the Arts, Grant for Fiction, 1972–1973
Creative Artists Public Service Program of New York State, 1972–1973
American Library Association Notable Book selection (Tell Me a Mitzi, 1970)
National Council on the Arts and Humanities Grant, 1967–1968
Guggenheim Fellowship, 1965–1966

External links 
Lore Segal Author Profile Melville House
Lore Segal Papers Manuscripts and Archives, New York Public Library
Lore Segal "Coming to America" Video Series The New Yorker
Jennifer Egan Reads Lore Segal The New Yorker
 Lore Segal Profile Jewish Women's Archive
 Spotlight on Lore Segal Random House/O. Henry Prize
 Lore Segal on Memory as the Writer's Notebook "The New Yorker," March 18, 2019
 Lore Segal Reads Dandelion "The New Yorker, March 25, 2019

References

1928 births
Living people
20th-century American novelists
20th-century American short story writers
20th-century American translators
20th-century American women writers
21st-century American Jews
21st-century American novelists
21st-century American short story writers
21st-century American translators
21st-century American women writers
Alumni of Bedford College, London
American children's writers
American people of Austrian-Jewish descent
American women academics
American women children's writers
American women novelists
American women short story writers
Austrian emigrants to the United States
Bennington College faculty
Columbia University faculty
Jewish American novelists
Jewish emigrants from Austria to the United Kingdom after the Anschluss
Kindertransport refugees
The New Yorker people
Novelists from New Jersey
Novelists from New York (state)
Novelists from Ohio
Novelists from Vermont
Ohio State University faculty
Princeton University faculty
Sarah Lawrence College faculty
Writers from New York City